The architecture of Azerbaijan (Azerbaijani: Azərbaycan memarlığı) refers to the architecture development in Azerbaijan.

Architecture in Azerbaijan typically combines elements of East and West. Many ancient architectural treasures such as the Maiden Tower and Palace of the Shirvanshahs in the walled city of Baku survive in modern Azerbaijan.
Among other medieval architectural treasures reflecting the influence of several schools are the Shirvan shahs' palace in Baku, the Palace of Shaki Khans in the town of Shaki in north-central Azerbaijan, the Surakhany Temple on the Apsheron Peninsula, a number of bridges spanning the Aras River, and several mausoleums. In the nineteenth and early twentieth centuries, little monumental architecture was created, but distinctive residences were built in Baku and elsewhere. Among the most recent architectural monuments, the Baku subways are noted for their lavish decor. The urban planning and architectural activities are regulated by the State Committee for City Building and Architecture of Azerbaijan Republic.

The Shirvanshah Palace 
The Shirvanshahs ruled the state of Shirvan in northern Azerbaijan from the 6th to the 16th centuries. Their attention shifted to Baku in the 12th century, when Shirvanshah Manuchehr III ordered that the city be surrounded with walls. In 1191, after a devastating earthquake destroyed the capital city of Shamakhi, the residence of the Shirvanshahs was moved to Baku, and the foundation of the Shirvanshah complex was laid. This complex, built on the highest point of Ichari Shahar, remains as one of the most striking monuments of medieval architecture in Azerbaijan.

The various sections of the Shirvanshah complex were not all created at the same time, and there was not a general plan for the entire complex's construction. Rather, each building was added as the need arose.

Ornamental designs found on the buildings of the Shirvanshah Palace.

Below: Drop-like medallion from the Royal Tomb with the name of the architect, Mohammad Ali, and the word for architect (me'mar) encrypted to be read in the reverse reflection of a mirror.

Much of the construction was done in the 15th century, during the reign of Khalilullah I and his son Farrukh Yassar in 1435-1442.

The buildings that belong to the complex include what may have been living quarters, a mosque, the octagonal-shaped Divankhana (Royal Assembly), a tomb for royal family members, the mausoleum of Seyid Yahya Bakuvi (a famous astronomer of the time) and a bathhouse.

All of these buildings except for the living premises and bathhouse are fairly well preserved. The Shirvanshah complex itself is currently under reconstruction. It has 27 rooms on the first floor and 25 on the second.

The actual original function of the Shirvanshah complex is still under investigation. Though commonly described as a palace, some experts question this. The complex simply doesn't have the royal grandeur and huge spaces normally associated with a palace; for instance, there are no grand entrances for receiving guests or huge royal bedrooms. Most of the rooms seem more suitable for small offices or monks' living quarters.

Divankhana

This unique building, located on the upper level of the grounds, takes on the shape of an octagonal pavilion. The filigree portal entrance is elaborately worked in limestone.

The central inscription with the date of the Assembly's construction and the name of the architect may have been removed after Shah Ismayil Khatai conquered Baku in 1501.

However, there are two very interesting hexagonal medallions on either side of the entrance. Each consists of six rhombuses with very unusual patterns carved in stone. Each elaborate design includes the fundamental tenets of the Shiite faith: "There is no other God but God. Mohammad is his prophet. Ali is the head of the believers." In several rhombuses, the word "Allah" (God) is hewn in reverse so that it can be read in a mirror. It seems looking-glass reflection carvings were quite common in the Oriental world at that time.

Scholars believe that the Divankhana was a mausoleum meant for, or perhaps even used for, Khalilullah I. Its rotunda resembles those found in the mausoleums of Bayandur and Mama-Khatun in Turkey. Also, the small room that precedes the main octagonal hall is a common feature in mausoleums of Shirvan.

The Shirvanshah Tomb

This building is located in the lower level of the grounds and is known as the Turba (burial vault). An inscription dates the vault to 1435-1436 and says that Khalilullah I built it for his mother Bika khanim and his son Farrukh Yamin. His mother died in 1435 and his son died in 1442, at the age of seven. Ten more tombs were discovered later on; these may have belonged to other members of the Shah's family, including two more sons who died during his own lifetime.

The entrance to the tomb is decorated with stalactite carvings in limestone. One of the most interesting features of this portal is the two drop-shaped medallions on either side of the Koranic inscription. At first, they seem to be only decorative.

The Turba is one of the few areas in the Shirvanshah complex where we actually know the name of the architect who built the structure. In the portal of the burial vault, the name "Me'mar (architect) Ali" is carved into the design, but in reverse, as if reflected in a mirror. Some scholars suggest that if the Shah had discovered that his architect inscribed his own name in a higher position than the Shah's, he would have been severely punished. The mirror effect was introduced so that he could leave his name for posterity.

Remnants of history
Another important section of the grounds is the mosque. According to complicated inscriptions on its minaret, Khalilullah I ordered its construction in 1441. This minaret is 22 meters in height (approximately 66 feet). Key Gubad Mosque, which is just a few meters outside the complex, was built in the 13th century. It was destroyed in 1918 in a fire; only the bases of its walls and columns remain. Nearby is the 15th-century Mausoleum, which is said to be the burial place of court astronomer Seyid Yahya Bakuvi.

Murad's Gate was a later addition to the complex. An inscription on the gate tells that it was built by a Baku citizen named Baba Rajab during the rule of Turkish sultan Murad III in 1586. It apparently served as a gateway to a building, but it is not known what kind of building it was or even if it ever existed.

In the 19th century, the complex was used as an arms depot. Walls were added around its perimeter, with narrow slits hewn out of the rock so that weapons could be fired from them. These anachronistic details don't bear much connection to the Shirvanshahs, but they do hint at how the buildings have managed to survive the political vicissitudes brought on by history.

In the courtyard can be seen some of the carved stones from the friezes that were brought up from the ruined Sabayil fortress that lies submerged underwater off Baku's shore. The stones have carved writing that records the genealogy of the Shirvanshahs.

The complex was designated as a historical site in 1920, and reconstruction has continued off and on ever since that time. According to Sevda Dadashova, Director, restoration is currently progressing, though much slower than desired because of a lack of funding.

Palaces

Mosques

Castles and fortresses

Skyscrapers and highrises 
At the end of the 1990s the highrise buildings abundantly appeared in Baku, the capital city of Azerbaijan. The most eminent buildings are "Flame Towers", "Port Baku Towers", "Trump International Hotel & Tower Baku", "Azure". "SOCAR Tower" and "The Crescent Development project" are under construction and planned to be the highest after completion.

20th-century architecture of Azerbaijan 
The Initial stage of architectural development in Azerbaijan during the Soviet era is related to the establishment working settlement around Baku such as Binagadi, Rasulzade, Bakikhanov, Montin, Mammadyarov.

The general layout of the Greater Baku, one of the first major plans in the former USSR, also included construction of new regions. In addition to measures to solve the housing problem, transport communication has also been improved in the Absheron.

The first graduate program of the Faculty of Construction in Polytechnical Institute of Azerbaijan was in 1929. The young architects S.Dadashov and M.Useynov created the Bayil factory (present-day maternity hospital), the new building of the Azerbaijan Industrial Institute (present Azerbaijan State Academy of Oil and Industry) (1932), House of Fine Arts Workers, a number of residential buildings the Pedagogical Technical School in Gazakh (all in 1933) and achieved their construction.

From the 1930s, a new stage in Azerbaijani architecture has begun. The construction of Governmental House of Baku has started in 1934, but the beginning of the Second World War ceased the construction operation. After the Second World War in 1945, the construction of the unfinished building has begun. Finally, the construction of this building has been completed in 1952.

The Nizami Theatre and the former building of the Ministry of Food Industry of the Republic of Azerbaijan (both during 1937-1939), which were constructed on the bases of S.Dadashov and M.Useinov's projects, is different from other buildings due to its volume-space structure and architectural solutions.

At the end of the 1930s, many school buildings were built in the country, as well as the general layouts of Yevlakh, Khankendi and Sheki cities were started.

AZERBAIJAN NATIONAL LIBRARY named after M.F.AXUNDOV was built in 1961 in the synthesis of modern and classical style. The project of this library was provided by Mikhail Huseynov, known as the largest library building in the Caucasus.

Yusif ibn Kuseyr and Momina Khatun mausoleums created by Adjami Nakhchivani, whose was celebrated 850 years in 1976, were rescued from destruction and reconstructed.

The Presidential Palace was built on the basis of a project built under design Fuad Orujov (project manager), Tahir Allahverdiyev (architect) and Madat Khalafov (designer) during 1977–1986 years. Presidential palace is a twelve-storey building with cover materials of marble and granite.

Different decisions and events, related to problems of protection of historically Azerbaijani towns and all town-building systems, have been carried out. Shaki (1968), Icharishahar in Baku, Shusha and Ordubad ( all in 1977), Lahidj settlement (1980), Nardaran village (1992), Shabran town, Davachi region (2002), Ilisu village, Qakh region (2002), Arpachay bank, Ordubad region (2002), Chiraggala tower, Davachi region (2002), Kish village, Shaki region (2003), Pir Huseyn khanagah (abode), Hadjigabul region (2004) were announced as historical reserves of the architecture of Azerbaijan.

21st-century architecture of Azerbaijan

Flame Towers 

Azerbaijan has long been called The Land of Fire. For this reason, many flame figures are being used in this country. The Flame Towers architecture is the most prominent representative of flame figures in Azerbaijan. The flame-shaped structure is equipped with LED screens. It is the tallest building in the country with height of 182 m. The total area of the building is 235,000 square meters. The Flame Towers consist of three buildings, including hotel, apartments, and offices. The building's construction began in 2007, with completion in 2012. In 2013, it was awarded the "best hotel and tourist center" grant by MIPIM.

Haydar Aliyev Culture Center 

One of the most important and visible example of new architecture in Azerbaijan is Haydar Aliyev Center. The Haydar Aliyev Cultural Center includes the history of rise of the Caspian Sea in the Azerbaijani mythology. Iraqi-British architect Zaha Hadid was appointed as an architectural designer of the Haydar Aliyev Center in 2007. The center is considered to be the one of the symbols of modern Baku. The area of the complex is 15.93 hectares. The straight line has not been used in the project. The lines of the building symbolize the merging of the past with the future. Center aims breaking from the monumental Soviet architecture which is quite common in Baku and to express the sensibilities of Azeri culture and the optimism of a nation that looks to the future.

Baku Crystal Hall 

The Baku Crystal Hall is sport-entertainment complex, which was built to host the Eurovision 2012 in Baku. On August 2, 2011, it was announced that main agreement was signed with the German construction company named ‘’Alpine Bau Deutschland AG’’ and necessary preparation had begun.  Arena construction was completed on 16 April 2012. The capacity of this hall is 25,000 spectators and VIP rooms in the arena. The magnificent lighting system used in the Baku Crystal Hall consists of over 2,500 projectors and more than 3,000 meters of cable which were brought from Germany. Light-emitting diodes with an area of more than 1,300 m are placed in the form of electronic windows on the scene of the Baku Crystal Hall.

Baku Olympic Stadium 

The construction of the stadium has started on June 6, 2011 with the participation of President Ilham Aliyev, former FIFA and UEFA presidents - Sepp Blatter and Michel Platini respectively. The opening ceremony of Baku Olympic Stadium was held on March 6, 2015 and stadium is considered to hold major sport events in Azerbaijan. This multifunctional stadium is the largest stadium in Azerbaijan with total capacity of 68,700 seats for spectators. The Baku Olympic Stadium is chosen to be the 7th best stadium in the world by StadiumDB. The construction of the stadium was given to TEKFEN which is the Turkish company with Design &Build contracts.  Several hotels, parking spaces (total 3,617 car places) and green space (81,574 square meters) has been created in the area around the stadium. Baku Olympic Stadium is consisting of VVIP, VIP - CIP Suites total 127 each with 720 spectator's capacity, 1,800 Seating Capacity Warm Up Area, MEP Building, Info Centre and Two External Buildings.

National Gymnastics Arena 

The National Gymnastics Arena, designed for 9,000 people, is located close to the Koroghlu metro station on the Heydar Aliyev highway. The number of seats can be altered from 5,000 to 9,000 seats depending on the capacity and nature of the competition. The Arena has 2 stages, VIP category for serving sponsors on each floor, resting rooms, and a dining room.

Gallery

See also

 Architecture of Baku
 Culture of Azerbaijan

References

Seyran Valiyev and Fuad Akhundov both contributed to this article. The book "Baku" by Leonid Bretanskiy was also referenced (Iskusstvo (Art) Publishing House: Leningrad, Moscow, 1970).